Jasur Hasanov may refer to:
Jasur Hasanov (footballer, born 1983), Uzbek footballer, full name Jasur Orziqulovich Hasanov
Jasur Hasanov (footballer, born 1989), Uzbek footballer, full name Jasur Jumamurotovich Hasanov